Royal Bank of Canada (RBC) is a Canadian multinational financial services company and the largest bank in Canada by market capitalization. The bank serves over 17 million clients and has more than 89,000 employees worldwide. Founded in 1864 in Halifax, Nova Scotia, it maintains a corporate headquarters in Toronto and its head office in Montreal. RBC's institution number is 003. In November 2017, RBC was added to the Financial Stability Board's list of global systemically important banks.

In Canada, the bank's personal and commercial banking operations are branded as RBC Royal Bank in English and RBC Banque Royale in French and serves approximately 10 million clients through its network of 1,209 branches. RBC Bank is a US banking subsidiary which formerly operated 439 branches across six states in the Southeastern United States, but now only offers cross-border banking services to Canadian travellers and expats. RBC's other US subsidiary City National Bank operates 79 branches across 11 US states. RBC also has 127 branches across seventeen countries in the Caribbean, which serve more than 16 million clients. RBC Capital Markets is RBC's worldwide investment and corporate banking subsidiary, while the investment brokerage firm is known as RBC Dominion Securities. Investment banking services are also provided through RBC Bank and the focus is on middle market clients.

In 2011, RBC was the largest Canadian company by revenue and market capitalization and was ranked 50th in the 2013 Forbes Global 2000 listing. The company has operations in Canada and 36 other countries, and had CA$1.01 trillion of assets under management in 2021.

History
In 1864, the Merchants Bank of Halifax was founded in Halifax, Nova Scotia, as a commercial bank that financed the fishing and timber industries and the European and Caribbean import/export businesses. By 1869 the Merchants' Bank was officially incorporated and received its federal charter in the same year. During the 1870s and 1880s, the bank expanded into the other Maritime Provinces. When both the Newfoundland Commercial Bank and Union Bank of Newfoundland collapsed on 10 December 1894, the Merchants Bank expanded to Newfoundland on 31 January 1895.

As the bank grew, executives changed its name to reflect its growth and western expansion. In 1901, the Merchants Bank of Halifax changed its name to the Royal Bank of Canada (RBC). The centre of the Canadian financial industry had moved from Halifax to Montreal, so the Merchants Bank relocated its head office there. In 1910, RBC merged with the Union Bank of Halifax. In the same year it built a bank branch in Winnipeg, Manitoba, designed by Carrère and Hastings, in beaux-arts classicism proclaiming the financial dominance of Winnipeg in the prairies. To improve its position in Ontario, RBC merged with Traders Bank of Canada in 1912 and in 1917 RBC merged with Quebec Bank, which was founded in 1818 and chartered in 1822 in Quebec City.

RBC's presence in Manitoba and Saskatchewan was strengthened through a 1918 merger with Northern Crown Bank, the product of the 1908 merger of Northern Bank (established in 1905 in Winnipeg) and Crown Bank of Canada (1904), based in Ontario. RBC's presence in the Canadian Prairie was further expanded by the 1925 merger with the Union Bank of Canada, which had begun in Quebec City in 1865 as the Union Bank of Lower Canada, but changed its name in 1886. The Union Bank of Canada had moved its headquarters to Winnipeg in 1912, and had built a strong presence in the Prairies and opened the first bank in the Northwest Territories at Fort Smith in 1921.

In 1935, RBC merged with Crown Savings and Loan Co. merged with Industrial Mortgage & Trust Co.

RoyWest Banking Corporation was formed in Nassau, Bahamas in 1965, to undertake medium-term lending and trustee business in the British West Indies. Majority owned by seven firms, including RBC and Westminster Bank, sole ownership transferred to National Westminster Bank in 1987.

RBC installed its first computer in 1961, the IBM 1401, the first to do so in Canadian banking. In the 1960s, RBC Insurance was created. In 1968, it merged with Ontario Loan and Debenture Company (formerly Ontario Savings and Investment Society). RBC Insurance is the largest Canadian bank-owned insurance organization, with services to over five million people. It provides life, health, travel, home and auto and reinsurance products as well as creditor and business insurance services. In 1993, RBC merged with Royal Trust.

In 1998, RBC acquired Security First Network Bank in Atlanta—the first pure Internet bank. In the same year, the Royal Bank of Canada proposed to merge with the Bank of Montreal, at the same time as the Toronto-Dominion Bank proposed to merge with the Canadian Imperial Bank of Commerce. Both mergers were examined by the Competition Bureau of Canada, and ultimately rejected by Paul Martin, at the time the Finance Minister of Canada, and future Prime Minister.

In 2000, RBC merged merchant credit/debit card acquiring business with the Bank of Montreal's to form Moneris Solutions. In 2013, RBC completed the acquisition of the Canadian subsidiary of Ally Financial.

An RBC branch in The Glebe neighbourhood of Ottawa was firebombed in May 2010. The party responsible later identified themselves on Independent Media Center and threatened to make their presence at the upcoming 2010 Winter Olympics in Vancouver, as RBC was one of its key sponsors, as well as at the 2010 G20 Toronto summit.

In November 2022, RBC announced purchasing HSBC Canada, this deal included acquiring 100% of the common shares of HSBC Canada for an all-cash purchase price of $13.5 billion, which is a multiple of 9.4 times HSBC Canada's estimated 2024 earnings. Completion of the transaction is expected by late 2023, subject to regulatory approvals.

International expansion

 1882: Merchants Bank of Halifax opened offices in Bermuda and Newfoundland.
 1899: RBC opened an agency in New York City and a branch in Havana.
 1903: RBC bought Banco de Oriente de Santiago de Cuba. By the mid-1920s, RBC had 65 branches in Cuba and is the largest bank in the country.
 1904: RBC bought Banco del Commercio de Havana.
 1907: RBC opened a branch in San Juan, Puerto Rico; branches in Mayagüez and Ponce followed.
 1909: RBC established a branch in Nassau, Bahamas.
 1910: RBC opened a branch in London and acquired branches in Puerto Rico and Port of Spain, Trinidad as a result of its acquisition of Union Bank of Halifax.
 1911: RBC opened an agency in New York City, and branches in Bridgetown, Barbados, and Kingston, Jamaica.
 1912: RBC bought Bank of British Honduras (incorporated in 1902 by United States citizens from Mobile) in British Honduras, which it converted to a branch.
 RBC opened a branch in the Dominican Republic; three more follow.
 1913: RBC opened a branch in Grenada.
 1914: RBC bought out Bank of British Guiana (est. 1836), in British Guiana, and converted it to a branch.
 1915: RBC opened branches in Costa Rica, Antigua, Dominica, and Saint Kitts.
 1916: RBC opened a branch in Venezuela.
 1917: RBC opened branches in Antigua, Dominica, St. Kitts, Montserrat, Nevis, and Tobago.
 1918: RBC opened a branch in Barcelona, and another in Vladivostok that lasted less than a year.
 1919: RBC opened branches in Brazil, Argentina, Uruguay, Paris, Martinique, Guadeloupe, and Port-au-Prince, Haiti.
 1920: RBC opened a branch in Colombia and a branch in Castries, St Lucia.
 1923: RBC bought and consolidated the banking operations of Pedro Gomez Mena e Hijo in Cuba.
 1925: RBC opened a branch in Peru, and acquired the American-owned, and failed, Bank of Central and South America. The purchase of BCSA brought with it subsidiaries, and their branches, in Colombia, Costa Rica, Peru, and Venezuela
 1932: RBC closed its branch in St. Lucia.
 1940: RBC closed its branches in Martinique and Guadeloupe.
 1959: RBC opened a branch in St. Vincent.
 1960: RBC returned to St. Lucia.
 1960: Fidel Castro's regime acquired RBC's operations in Cuba on 8 December. At the time of the forced sale, RBC had 24 branches in Cuba. From 1961 to 1965, RBC maintained a Special Representative in Havana to facilitate trade between Cuba and Canada. After the failed Bay of Pigs Invasion in April 1961, the Special Representative acted as a financial intermediary between the American and Cuban governments to manage the ransoming of the prisoners for food and agricultural machinery.
 1964: RBC opened a branch in George Town, Cayman Islands.
 1970s: As a result of Law 75, RBC's operations in Colombia became Banco Royal Colombiano.
 1973: RBC was forced to incorporate its operations in Jamaica, which became Royal Bank (Jamaica).
 1980: RBC purchased Banco de San Juan in Puerto Rico, adding its 14 branches to the six that RBC already had in Puerto Rico. RBC sold its assets in Grenada to Republic Bank of Trinidad and Tobago.
 1985: RBC started to withdraw from much of the Caribbean.
 It sold its 12 branches in the Dominican Republic to Banco de Comercio Dominicano.
 It also sold its stake in Royal Bank (Jamaica) to Jamaica Mutual Life Assurance. Branches in Curacao, Aruba, St. Maarten and Dominica are still open (1985–present)
 The Government of Guyana nationalized its operations there and renamed the bank the National Bank of Industry and Commerce Ltd.
Additionally, RBC incorporated its operations in Trinidad and Tobago locally, floating the shares, thereby divesting itself of ownership. The new bank took the name Royal Bank of Trinidad and Tobago (RBTT).
 1986: National Mutual Royal Bank opened in Australia with RBC having a 50% shareholding
 1986: RBC sold its two branches in Haiti to Societe Generale Haitienne de Banque, a local bank.
 1987: RBC sold its operations in Belize, ex-British Honduras, to Belize Holdings Inc., which renamed them Belize Bank.
 1990: National Mutual Royal Bank in Australia sold to the Australia and New Zealand Banking Group
 1993: RBC sold Royal Bank of Puerto Rico to Spain's Banco Bilbao-Vizcaya.
 1995: RBC sold Royal Trust Bank (Austria) to Anglo Irish Bank, which renamed it Anglo Irish Bank (Austria).
 2000: Acquired Dain Rauscher Wessels, a US brokerage and investment banking firm based in Minneapolis, Minnesota
 2001: RBC acquired Centura Bank based in Rocky Mount, North Carolina.
 2001: RBC bought the investment banking and brokerage firm Tucker Anthony Sutro (Boston) from John Hancock Mutual Life Insurance Co.
 2003: RBC purchased Florida interest in Provident Financial Group, Cincinnati OH.
 2006: RBC upgraded its representative office in Beijing, China, to a branch.
 2006: Created an institutional investment joint venture with Dexia. The 50/50 partnership operated under the name RBC Dexia Investor Services.
 2008: RBC established a representative office in Mumbai, India. RBC re-acquired 98.14% of the shares of Royal Bank of Trinidad and Tobago. This brought RBC back to Trinidad and Tobago 20 years after it had withdrawn and provided it with a presence in other islands served by RBTT.
 2011: RBC sold RBC Bank to PNC Financial Services for US$3.62 billion. PNC ATMs are now used by customers with RBC Bank (Georgia), N.A. providing Canadians with bank options when they are residing in the US.
 2012: RBC completed the acquisition of Dexia's 50% stake in RBC Dexia Investor Services Limited, making it the sole owner of the newly named [RBC Investor & Treasury Services]. RBC also opened a Branch in Wilemstad, Curaçao.
 2014: RBC "entered into a merger agreement to acquire City National Corporation", a major U. S. bank.
 2015: RBC agreed to sell its Swiss private bank Royal Bank of Canada (Suisse) SA to local rival SYZ Group. Terms of the sale were not disclosed. Royal Bank of Canada (Suisse) manages CHF 10 billion (US$10.5 billion, C$13.4 billion) of assets for clients in Africa, the Middle East and South America.
 2015: RBC completed the acquisition of City National Bank (November)
 2016: On January 21, 2016, Aviva announced the acquisition of RBC General Insurance Company, for C$582 million.
 2019: RBC agreed to sell its Eastern Caribbean banking operations, in places such as Antigua, Dominica, and Saint Lucia, to a consortium of banks in the region.

Branding

Logo

The bank's symbol is a golden lion clutching a globe, on a blue background. An older version depicted a crown above the globe and the lion faced to the left. The change coincided with an expansion in United States markets. Over the years, the lion's mane has also become less detailed and more stylized, and the tongue was shortened.

Sponsorship
RBC sponsors cultural events including the Toronto International Film Festival. It also sponsors the RBC Taylor Prize, a literary award for non-fiction writing in Canada, and hosts a yearly Canadian Women Entrepreneur Award. In July 2013, the RBC Foundation partnered with the University of Toronto to revive the Siminovitch Prize in Theatre, given to recognize achievement in Canadian theatre.

RBC is one of Canada's largest sponsors of amateur sports and is the longest-running Canadian sponsor of the Olympic Games. It employs dozens of top-tier amateur athletes as part-time spokespeople through the RBC Olympians program. RBC is a former premier sponsor of Hockey Canada and previously owned the naming rights to the National Junior A Championship, then called the Royal Bank Cup (later the RBC Cup). In addition, it supports Canadian hockey at the grassroots level through the RBC Play Hockey program.

RBC owns naming rights to the RBC Centre, RBC Convention Centre Winnipeg, RBC Canadian Open, and RBC Heritage (formerly the Heritage Classic). From 2002 to 2012, RBC previously held the naming rights to what is now the PNC Arena in Raleigh, North Carolina.

RBC has owned naming rights for the Top 25 Canadian Immigrants Award, presented annually by Canadian Immigrant, since 2013.

Corporate governance
The title of Royal Bank's top executive has changed several times. Initially it was styled as President. Later, it became chief executive officer and one often carried additional responsibilities as chairman of the board, while the second-in-command was the President. Allan R. Taylor was chairman and CEO from 1986 to 1994, and he was succeeded by John Cleghorn in that capacity from 1994 to 2001. Dave McKay is currently the President and chief executive officer.

David P. O'Brien has served as the institution's chairman (non-executive) since 2004. The position was formerly held by Guy Saint-Pierre, who held the position from 2001 to 2004.

Chief executive officers

 Thomas Edward Kenny (1879–1908)
 Herbert Samuel Holt (1908–1934)
 Morris W. Wilson (1934–1946)
 Sydney Dobson (1946–1949)
 James Muir (1949–1960)
 W. Earle McLaughlin (1960–1979)
 Rowland C. Frazee (1977–1980)
 Jock K. Finlayson (1980–1983)
 Allan R. Taylor (1986–1994)
 John E. Cleghorn (1994–2001)
 Gordon Nixon (2001–2014)
 David I. McKay (2014–present)

Head offices

The head office for the institution was initially located at the Merchants' Bank of Halifax Building, on Bedford Row, Halifax, Nova Scotia. The building served as the head office for the bank from 1864 to 1907. In 1907, the RBC relocated its head office to the Four Pillars Building, at 147 Saint Jacques Street (renumbered 221 in 1928), Montreal. The building was used as RBC's head office until 1928. The Four Pillars Building was later demolished, with only its facade remaining. In 1928, RBC moved its head office to the Old Royal Bank Building, at 360 Saint Jacques Street, Montreal.

In 1962, RBC moved its head office to Place Ville-Marie, at University Street and René-Lévesque Boulevard in Montreal. In 1976, RBC completed Royal Bank Plaza, at 200 Bay Street, Toronto. The Royal Bank of Canada presently operates two headquarters, with its head office based at Place Ville-Marie, and a corporate headquarters at Royal Bank Plaza. Most of its management operations are based in Toronto.

Controversies

Discrimination
On January 15, 2007, CBC Radio reported RBC was "refusing" to open US dollar accounts for people of certain nationalities. Canadian citizens with dual citizenship in Cuba, Iran, Iraq, Myanmar, North Korea or Sudan (mostly countries with US sanctions) were affected. The US Treasury Department restricts certain foreign nationals from using the US dollar payment system to limit terrorism and money laundering after the September 11, 2001, attacks. RBC replied that compliance with such laws does not represent an endorsement by the bank and on January 17, clarified its position on the application of the US laws, specifying that "with some exceptions" it does open accounts for dual citizens of the sanctioned countries. There have also been reports that the bank had closed the accounts of some Iranian-Canadian citizens.

Environment
Environmental groups criticized RBC's financing of oil sands bitumen extraction and expansion, cumulatively issuing "more than $2.3 billion in loans and financing more than $6.9 billion in [corporate] debt between 2003 and 2007 for 13 companies including: Encana, Husky Energy, OPTI Canada, Delphi Energy, Canadian Oil Sands Trust, Northwest Upgrading, Suncor, TotalEnergies, Connacher Oil and Gas, InterPipeline and Enbridge". This opposition was due to the detrimental effect Oil Sands extraction has on the environment and human health.

A 2020 report on fossil fuel finance by the Sierra Club and Rainforest Action Network found that RBC was the fifth largest funder of fossil fuels in the world, and largest in Canada, investing over US$160 billion on fossil fuel projects since the Paris Agreement in 2015. This sparked criticism from environmental groups and climate activists.

Funding of SCO litigation on Linux 
RBC invested in SCO Group during the series of court cases seeking to collect royalties from the users of Linux.

Investor protection 
In 2014, the Commodity Futures Trading Commission fined RBC $35,000,000 for engaging in more than 1,000 wash sales, fictitious sales, and other non-competitive practices over a three year period.

Mismarking
In 2007, the Royal Bank of Canada fired several traders in its corporate bond business, after another trader accused them of mismarking bonds the bank held by overpricing them, and marked down the values of the bonds and recognized $13 million of trading losses relating to the bonds. The bank said it investigated the accusations, and took remedial action. The Globe and Mail noted: "traders might have an incentive to boost [the bonds'] prices because it could have an impact on their bonuses."

Temporary foreign workers and Canadian layoffs

In April 2013, the CBC reported that the Royal Bank of Canada was indirectly hiring temporary foreign workers to replace 45 Canadian information technology workers.

The CBC reported on May 7, 2013, that during Question Period in Parliament the NDP leveled accusations against the government and then Prime Minister Stephen Harper, to which he responded that the government has been working on problems with the Temporary Foreign Worker Program for more than a year.

Class-action lawsuit 

On December 29, 2022 the Supreme Court of Ontario certified a class-action lawsuit permitting employees of the Dominion Securities branch to seek $800 million in damages.

Memberships
RBC is a member of the Canadian Bankers Association and is a registered member with the Canada Deposit Insurance Corporation, a federal agency insuring deposits at all of Canada's chartered banks.

It is also a member of:

 CarIFS ATM Network
 Interac
 Mastercard (in Canadian and Caribbean markets)
 NYCE point of sale Network
 Plus Network
 Global Banking Alliance for Women

See also

 Big Five (banks)
 List of banks and credit unions in Canada
 List of banks in the Americas
 List of investors in Bernard L. Madoff Investment Securities
 List of largest banks

Notes

References

Works cited

Further reading

External links

 

 
1864 establishments in Nova Scotia
Banks established in 1864
Banks of Canada
Banks of the Caribbean
Canadian brands
Companies based in Toronto
Companies listed on the Toronto Stock Exchange
Mortgage lenders of Canada
Multinational companies headquartered in Canada
Outsourcing in Canada
S&P/TSX 60
Systemically important financial institutions